The Cellamare conspiracy of 1718 (French: Conspiration de Cellamare) was a conspiracy against the Regent of France, Philippe d'Orléans (1674–1723) that aimed to depose him of his position and place Philip V, then King of Spain, as the new regent of France. Concocted in Spain, the plot was the brainchild of Antonio del Giudice, Prince of Cellamare.

Background and plot
Antonio del Giudice was named the Spanish Ambassador to the French Court in 1715 during the reign of Louis XIV of France; Louis XIV died in September that year and his successor, Louis XV of France, aged five, was put under the care of the Duke of Orléans who was a nephew (as well as son-in-law) of the late Louis XIV. Antonio del Giudice went to France during the Regency of Philippe d'Orléans. 

At the instigation of Guillaume Dubois, Secretary of State for Foreign Affairs, France formed the Quadruple Alliance between England, Holland and the Holy Roman Empire to combat the possible personal union between France and Spain, should the five-year-old Louis XV die; Spain was then ruled by Louis XV's uncle, Phillip V, who had been king of Spain since the death of Charles II in 1700. The War of the Spanish Succession had resulted in the Treaty of Utrecht of April 1713; that treaty underlined that neither Philip nor his descendants could inherit the French throne, he having agreed to this previously.

The Prince of Cellamare and his embassy wanted to depose Philippe d'Orléans from power and make Philip V the Regent for his nephew. The plan was greatly supported by some of Philippe d'Orléans's most notorious enemies, namely the duke and the duchess du Maine, Louis Auguste de Bourbon and his wife, Louise Bénédicte de Bourbon, who had entered into correspondence with Spanish Prime Minister Giulio Alberoni, a favourite of Queen Elisabeth Farnese, and was trying to place her husband, the languid Duke of Maine, on the throne.

With the support of the Spanish ambassador, a plot to carry out the transferral was soon woven into the entourage of the duchess. According to the memoirs of the duchess's lady-in-waiting, Baroness de Staal, Melchior de Polignac and the Duke of Richelieu were part of the plot.

The Duke of Richelieu was then having a romantic affair with one of the regent's daughters, Charlotte Aglaé d'Orléans. The baroness's memoirs said that the duke and the duchess of Maine had wanted to call a meeting between the États généraux on the matter.

The correspondence between the duchess of Maine and Alberoni was later intercepted by the police and so was reported to the regent who acted swiftly; on 9 December, the Prince of Cellamare was arrested and sent back to Spain; Alberoni was arrested on 5 December 1718 at Poitiers. The duchess was exiled to Dijon while her husband was imprisoned in the fortress of Doullens in Picardy. The Duke of Richelieu was imprisoned in the Bastille where he was later visited by his lover, Charlotte Aglaé d'Orléans, dressed in disguise.

However, the guilty members of the plot were all pardoned by 1720 and allowed to return to their residences.

On 9 January 1719, France declared war on Spain, following in the footsteps of England who had done so a couple of weeks earlier, on 27 December 1718.

Two years later, the aims of the Cellamare conspiracy were revived in the Pontcallec conspiracy, four leaders of which were executed.

Notes

Sources
The current information was taken from the present Conspiration de Cellamare on French Wikipedia.

Conspiracies
1710s in Spain
1710s in France
War of the Spanish Succession
House of Bourbon (France)
House of Bourbon (Spain)
House of Orléans
Ancien Régime
Legal history of the Ancien Régime
Events of the Ancien Régime
Foreign relations of the Ancien Régime
Political history of the Ancien Régime
France–Spain relations
1718 in Spain
1718 in France